"Fuck What Ya Heard", also known by its censored title, "Forget What Ya Heard", is the second single from MC Ren's debut solo album, Shock of the Hour.

Single track listing

A-Side
"Forget What Ya Heard" (Edit)- 4:09  
"Fuck What Ya Heard" (Album Version)- 4:09

B-Side
"Mayday on the Front Line" (Album Version)- 4:26

1993 songs
1994 singles
MC Ren songs
Ruthless Records singles
Gangsta rap songs
Songs written by MC Ren